Willem Usselincx (1567 – c. 1647) was a Flemish Dutch merchant, investor and diplomat who was instrumental in drawing both Dutch and Swedish attention to the importance of the New World. Usselincx was the founding father of the Dutch West India Company.

Background
Usselincx was born in Antwerp (in present-day Flanders, Belgium), during a time of major upheaval and change. His lifespan covered the period of the Eighty Years' War (1568–1648), which was a Dutch Revolt against Spain that resulted in the secession of seven provinces that came to form the Republic of the Seven United Netherlands. At the time of his birth, Antwerp was the most prominent harbor of Western Europe. Over the first half of the 16th century, during its Golden Age, Antwerp grew to become the second-largest European city north of the Alps.

The religious revolution of the Reformation erupted in Antwerp with violent riots in August 1566, and the Eighty Years' War followed shortly after. The Spanish Crown succeeded in recapturing parts of the southern provinces of Flanders and Brabant. In 1579, the city of Antwerp joined the Union of Utrecht and became the capital of the Dutch Revolt. In 1585, Alessandro Farnese, Duke of Parma and Piacenza, eventually captured Antwerp after a long siege. As part of Antwerp's terms of surrender, its Protestant citizens were given four years to settle their affairs before quitting the city. Some returned to Roman Catholicism, but many left the city; of the pre-siege population of 100,000 people, only 40,000 remained. Most settlers went to the Republic of the Seven United Netherlands (the unoccupied part of the Union of Utrecht) in the north, laying the commercial foundation for the subsequent "Dutch Golden Age". Antwerp's banking was controlled for a generation by Genoa, and Amsterdam became the new trading centre of the region—the population of Amsterdam went from 30,000 in 1570 to 60,000 in 1600, and the Amsterdam Canal District was constructed to accommodate the traders and bankers from Antwerp. The Southern Netherlands became known as the Spanish Netherlands.

Dutch West India Company

Usselincx had spent some time in Spain, Portugal and on the Azores. There he saw the wealth that was produced by the Spanish and Portuguese colonies. Some time after the seizure of Antwerp by the Spanish in 1585, Usselincx moved to the Republic of the Seven United Netherlands, first to Middelburg and later to Amsterdam. He was convinced that the Netherlands would win independence and should capture colonies from Spain and Portugal.

His book Naerder Bedenckingen, Over de zee-vaert/ Coophandel ende Neeringhe alsmede de versekeringhe vanden Staet was first printed in 1608. This work translated into English as "Further reflections on the navigation, commerce and trade, and building of the state", presented Usselincx's arguments for a West India trading company and made frequent reference to the Spanish power and source of wealth in the West Indies.

In 1621, Usselincx was one of the founding fathers of the Dutch West India Company, an enterprise he had planned for many years. His intentions were not entirely commercial. He hoped to create a new and better society. He expected that thousands of Protestants would migrate to America. He did not wish so much to exploit the country, but rather to let arise a New Netherland. In this secondary goal, he was insufficiently supported by the States-General of the Netherlands.

Swedish South Company

Usselincx, drew the attention of Peter Minuit to Swedish efforts to found the colony which would later become New Sweden (Swedish: Nya Sverige). Like his friend Usselincx,  Peter Minuit had also been disappointed by the Dutch West India Company and was replaced as governor of New Amsterdam.

As early as 1626, Usselinx had described the advantages to Sweden of contributing in an overseas venture. He referred to the wealth acquired by Spain and The Netherlands in similar enterprises and extolled Sweden's resources for success in the marketplace. Usselinx received royal privileges from king Gustavus Adolphus of Sweden for a trading company. The king commissioned Usselinx to raise the capital for the Swedish South Company through stock subscriptions in Sweden and its territories.

Usselincx relocated from The Netherlands to Sweden but the process of the founding of the new company was difficult and time-consuming, despite the support of Axel Oxenstierna, Swedish Lord High Chancellor. Its charter included Swedish, Dutch, and German stockholders led by directors of the New Sweden Company. In 1637, Minuit made arrangements with Samuel Blommaert and the Swedish government to create New Sweden, the first Swedish colony in the New World. But by that time, Usselincx was largely financially ruined due to bad investments and unable to profit from his vision. Between 1638 and 1655, the company sponsored 11 expeditions to Delaware in 14 separate voyages (two did not survive).

In 1649 the Swedish South Company lost its monopoly on tobacco, granted by the king of Sweden in 1641. In 1655 New Sweden was annexed by New Netherland, this brought an end to the activities of the Swedish South Company, it was dissolved in 1680.

The Swedish East India Company (Swedish: Svenska Ostindiska Companiet or SOIC) would not be founded until 1731 for the purpose of conducting trade with the far east.

References

Other sources
 Fiske, John The Dutch and Quaker Colonies in America (New York: Houghton Mifflin, 1902)
Jameson, J. Franklin Willem Usselinx: Founder of the Dutch and Swedish West India Companies (G.P. Putnam's Sons. 1887)
Mickley, Joseph J. Some Account of William Usselinx and Peter Minuit: Two individuals who were instrumental in establishing the first permanent colony in Delaware (The Historical Society of Delaware. 1881)
Johnson, Amandus The Swedes on the Delaware, 1638-1664 (Philadelphia, PA: The Swedish Colonial Society. 1915)

External links
Governor's Island, Lifeblood of American Freedon

1567 births
1640s deaths
New Netherland
Dutch West India Company people
Businesspeople from Antwerp
17th-century Dutch people
Dutch company founders
Businesspeople of the Spanish Netherlands